The 2013–14 Ukrainian Premier League Reserves and Under 19 season are competitions between the reserves of Ukrainian Premier League Clubs and the Under 19s. The events in the senior leagues during the 2012–13 season saw no teams relegated with Kryvbas Kryvyi Rih Reserves expelled and Sevastopol Reserves entering the competition.

Managers

Final standings

Top scorers

Under 19 competition

First stage

Group A

Group B

See also
2013-14 Ukrainian Premier League

References

Reserves
Ukrainian Premier Reserve League seasons